For the 28th district in the Tennessee House of Representatives, see Tennessee House of Representatives 28th district
Tennessee's 28th Senate district is one of 33 districts in the Tennessee Senate. It has been represented by Republican Joey Hensley since 2012.

Geography
District 28 covers a rural swath of southern Middle Tennessee, including all of Giles, Lawrence, Lewis, Maury, Perry, and Wayne Counties. Communities in the district include Columbia, Lawrenceburg, Pulaski, Mount Pleasant, Waynesboro, Hohenwald, Linden, and part of Spring Hill.

The district overlaps with Tennessee's 4th and 7th congressional districts, and overlaps with the 64th, 69th, 70th, 71st, and 72nd districts of the Tennessee House of Representatives. It borders the state of Alabama.

Recent election results
Tennessee Senators are elected to staggered four-year terms, with odd-numbered districts holding elections in midterm years and even-numbered districts holding elections in presidential years.

2020

2016

2012

Federal and statewide results in District 28

References

28
Giles County, Tennessee
Lawrence County, Tennessee
Lewis County, Tennessee
Maury County, Tennessee
Perry County, Tennessee
Wayne County, Tennessee